Marlies ter Borg-Neervoort ( born 24 December 1948, Pladjoe, Palembang) is a Dutch philosopher, editor and author. Her work focuses principally on the study of texts in the Bible and Qu'ran. She is the author of Koran en Bijbel in Verhalen (Qu'ran and Bible in Stories) and Sharing Mary: Bible and Qu'ran side by side. Both works focus on comparative textual analysis in both holy books.

References 

1948 births
Living people
21st-century Dutch philosophers
Dutch sociologists
Dutch women sociologists
Dutch women philosophers
People from Palembang
Religious philosophers
Vrije Universiteit Amsterdam alumni